Savriyan Alexeyevich Danilov (born 3 June 2000) is a Russian tennis player.

Danilov has a career high ATP singles ranking of 564 achieved on 14 October 2019. He also has a career high ATP doubles ranking of 756 achieved on 26 August 2019.

Danilov made his ATP main draw debut at the 2019 Kremlin Cup after receiving a wildcard for the doubles main draw partnering Roman Safiullin.

References

External links

2000 births
Living people
Russian male tennis players
Tennis players from Moscow